Wayne J. McConnell (April 9, 1912 – July 3, 1981) was an American football coach.  He served as the head football coach at the College of Emporia in Emporia, Kansas from 1950 to 1955 and Fort Hays State University in Hays, Kansas from 1956 to 1968, and compiling a career college football coaching record of 83–80–4.

Coaching career

College of Emporia
McConnell was named the head football coach at the College of Emporia in Emporia, Kansas before the start of the 1950 season and held that post through the completion  of the 1955 season. His College of Emporia Fighting Presbies football teams posted a record of 39–12–1 in six seasons.  They were champions of the Kansas Collegiate Athletic Conference (KCAC) four times and made an appearance in the Mineral Water Bowl in 1954.

Fort Hays State
McConnell was the head football coach at Fort Hays State University in Hays, Kansas for 13 seasons, from 1956 to 1968.  His Fort Hays State Tigers football team had a record of 45–67–3.

Head coaching record

College football

References

1912 births
1981 deaths
College of Emporia Fighting Presbies athletic directors
College of Emporia Fighting Presbies football coaches
Fort Hays State Tigers football coaches
High school basketball coaches in Kansas
High school football coaches in Kansas
Washburn University alumni
People from Atchison County, Kansas
People from Shawnee County, Kansas
Coaches of American football from Kansas